Knob Fork is a diffuse, unincorporated hamlet in Wetzel County, West Virginia, United States. It lies at an elevation of 1050 feet (320 m).  Its only business or service is a wholesale nursery.  Other names for the community have included Geaneytown, Jolliff, Jolliffe, Jolliffes Store, Knobfork Store, Sugar Run, and Uniontown. The present name is derived from the nearby Knob Fork creek.

References

Unincorporated communities in Wetzel County, West Virginia
Unincorporated communities in West Virginia